Livewire was a music periodical published between 1991 and 1997, specializing in rock and metal music.

History
The magazine was headed by editor Mike Smith, formerly of Powerline. Appearing on newsstands in September 1991, its format and art direction largely followed in the footsteps of its predecessor.

Canadian author Martin Popoff was a reviewer for the magazine.

Acquisition and reboot
In 1996, parent company Kearny Publishing was sold to new owners in Florida and renamed Princeton Publishing. The magazine was subsequently repackaged as a generalist publication with a new art direction and stronger emphasis on alternative rock and pop rock.
By March 1998, Princeton was left reeling from its acquisition frenzy and opted to consolidate its editorial staff into a single Miami area location, while Livewire was quietly discontinued. Princeton would fold soon after.

References

Music magazines published in the United States
Defunct magazines published in the United States
Heavy metal publications
Magazines established in 1991
Magazines disestablished in 1997
Magazines published in New York City